Astakul (also Romanized as Āstākūl; also known as Āstākol) is a village in Ab Bar Rural District, in the Central District of Tarom County, Zanjan Province, Iran. At the 2006 census, its population was 847, in 189 families.

References 

Populated places in Tarom County